Martina Heide Stenzel  is a Professor in the Department of Chemistry at the University of New South Wales (UNSW).  She is also a Royal Australian Chemical Institute (RACI) University Ambassador. She became editor for the Australian Journal of Chemistry in 2008 and has served as Scientific Editor and as of 2021, as Editorial Board Chair of RSC Materials Horizons.

Stenzel studies polymer synthesis and applications of polymers in medicine, particularly the use of nanoparticles for drug delivery.  She attempts to understand relationships between the structure of polymers and their properties.
Stenzel was the first woman to be awarded the Liversidge Medal by the Royal Society of New South Wales, in the medal's 88 year history.

Education
Professor Martina Stenzel studied chemistry (1990—1996) at the University of Bayreuth in Germany.  After completing a master's degree in science she continued her postgraduate studies at the Institute of Applied Macromolecular Chemistry at the University of Stuttgart. In 1999, Stenzel completed her PhD thesis on Synthesis and Characterization Cu(I) containing polyurethanes for the application as a carrier membrane for the separation of ethylene from gas mixtures.

Career
Stenzel then moved to Australia to take up a postdoctoral fellows position at the UNESCO Centre for Membrane Science and Technology, at the University of New South Wales (UNSW).
She became a lecturer there in 2002.
She won an ARC Future Fellowship in 2009 and became a Full Professor as of 2012.  She was promoted to Co-director of the Centre for Advanced Macromolecular Design (CAMD) in 2013.  In 2014, Stenzel joined the School of Chemistry at UNSW to build a research program focusing on polymeric nanomaterials and biomaterials.

Research 
Stenzel's research interests have shifted from pure polymer synthesis to the application of polymers in biomedicine particularly drug delivery. 

Stenzel studies the use of nanoparticles to administer therapeutic drugs, developing a toolset for the design of very small nanoparticles. She attempts to understand relationships between the structure of polymers and their properties. Her work has implications for nanomedicine, catalysis and biosensors.

 Stenzel has authored over 385 journal articles.

Awards
 2020: Australian Laureate Fellowship, Australian Research Council (ARC)
 2020: Archibald Liversidge Medal and Lecture of the Royal Society of New South Wales, for outstanding contribution to chemistry research.
 2018: Elected Fellow of the Australian Academy of Science (FAA)
 2017: HG Smith Memorial Award, Royal Australian Chemical Institute (RACI)
 2013, Excellence in Engineering and Information and Communications Technologies, NSW Science & Engineering Awards, New South Wales Government
 2012: Polymer Division Citations (33APS), RACI
 2011: Le Fèvre Memorial Prize (now LeFevre Medal) of the Australian Academy of Science
 2009: ARC Future Fellow, Australian Research Council
 2008: David Sangster Polymer Science and Technology Achievement Award, RACI 
 2006: Finalist of the Eureka Prize of the Australian Museum, Category "People's choice award" and "UNSW Eureka Prize for Scientific research"

References

External links
Scopus Publications

Australian chemists
Australian women chemists
Living people
Year of birth missing (living people)
Fellows of the Australian Academy of Science
German emigrants to Australia
Academic staff of the University of New South Wales
University of Bayreuth alumni
University of Stuttgart alumni